The Mark Spencer Hotel is a hotel in Portland, Oregon. The hotel opened in 1907 as the Hotel Nortonia and has hosted many notable people, including Louis Armstrong, Sammy Davis Jr., Lionel Hampton, Spike Jones, and Mel Tormé.

References

1907 establishments in Oregon
Hotel buildings completed in 1907
Hotels in Portland, Oregon
Southwest Portland, Oregon